Angus Tung (born 26 July 1959) is a Taiwanese singer-songwriter and record producer from the mid-1980s to mid-1990s. Blessed with boyish good looks and talent, Angus Tung debuted in 1983 and released his first solo album "Miss You" (想你) two years after. He subsequently released 14 albums, including a Chinese pop classic "Thinking of You" (其实你不懂我的心). To date, he has won numerous musical and popularity awards such as "Best Male Vocalist" and "Top Ten Most Popular Artiste in China". In recent years, despite being more active with drama serials and radio hosting in China, Tung continues to compose and sing songs.

Discography
想你 (1985)
女人 (1986)
我曾經愛過 (1986)
跟我來 (1987)
其實你不懂我的心 (1989)
夢開始的地方 (1989)
花瓣雨 (1990)
真愛是誰 (1990)
一世情緣 (1991)
愛與哀愁 (1992)
現在以後 (1994)
聽海的歌 (1995)
看未來有甚麼不一樣 (1995)
收留 (1996)
青春手卷 (2003)

External links
Angus Tung fan site
Angus Tung freshens up folk music
Singer Angus Tung Stirs Fans in Wuxi

1959 births
Living people
20th-century Taiwanese male  singers
21st-century Taiwanese  male singers
Taiwanese Mandopop singer-songwriters
Musicians from Kaohsiung
Writers from Kaohsiung
Taiwanese Christians